Oghara is a town located in Ethiope West Local Government Area of Delta State, Nigeria.

Educational institutions 
Oghara is home to several known educational institutions in Nigeria. The town is home to the Delta State Polytechnic, Otefe-Oghara; Western Delta University, Oghara; Delta State University Teaching Hospital (DELSUTH), Oghara; Oghareki Model Secondary School, Oghareki; Ogini Grammar school, Uherevie Primary School and Ogharefe Secondary School -Ogharefe.

Festivals 
The people of Ogharefe, sub clan of the Oghara Kingdom, celebrate the Iyerin Festival annually. The festival is celebrated annually in order to sustain the customs and traditions of the Ogharefe people in Oghara Kingdom.

Notable people 

 Chief James Onanefe Ibori

References 

https://www.helpmecovid.com/ng/81408_rainoil-depot-oghara

https://freshangleng.com/13626/nigeria’s-crude-oil%2C-gas-production-to-plummet-by-30%2C000-bpd%2C-56-million-cubic-daily

https://www.channelstv.com/tag/npdc/

https://tribuneonlineng.com/delta-may-partner-private-sector-oghara-power-project-okowa/

https://www.discoveryjournals.org/discovery/current_issue/v58/n314/A2.pdf?

See also 
 Oghara-Iyede

Populated places in Delta State